To Hell and Back is the second album by the power metal band Sinergy, it was released on July 25, 2000. It featured a cover version of "Hanging on the Telephone", originally by The Nerves and made famous by Blondie and the Japanese release bonus track is a cover version of "Invincible", originally by Pat Benatar.

The song "Gallowmere" is inspired by MediEvil.

Track listing

Credits
Kimberly Goss - Vocals
Alexi Laiho - Guitars
Roope Latvala - Guitars
Marko Hietala - Bass, Additional Vocals (on track 3 and 7)
Tommi Lillman - Drums

References

2000 albums
Sinergy albums
Nuclear Blast albums